Giovanni Maria Arena (born 18 January 1950 in Viterbo) is an Italian politician.

He is a member of the centre-right party Forza Italia. He was elected Mayor of Viterbo on 27 June 2018.

See also
2018 Italian local elections
List of mayors of Viterbo

References

External links
 
 

1950 births
Living people
Mayors of places in Lazio
People from Viterbo
Forza Italia politicians
The People of Freedom politicians
Forza Italia (2013) politicians